Jack Mingjie Lin (born April 15, 1999) is a tennis player from Canada. He reached a career high ATP men's singles ranking of 605 on July 15, 2019. He made his ATP Tour debut by receiving a wild card to the 2019 New York Open, where he lost his 1st round match to Brayden Schnur.

References

External links 

 
 

1999 births
Living people
Canadian male tennis players
Columbia Lions men's tennis players
Sportspeople from Markham, Ontario
20th-century Canadian people
21st-century Canadian people